Gerry McCaul is a former Gaelic football manager and player who spent time in both roles with the senior Dublin county team. Before being appointed as manager of Dublin, McCaul had been the player-manager of Dublin club Ballymun Kickhams. He is the brother of former Dublin player Anto McCaul who also played with Ballymun Kickhams. Gerry also played at UCD with players such as Gerry McEntee.

He is a secondary school principal.

References

Year of birth missing (living people)
Living people
Alumni of University College Dublin
Ballymun Kickhams Gaelic footballers
Dublin inter-county Gaelic footballers
Gaelic football backs
Gaelic football managers
Gaelic football player-managers
Heads of schools in Ireland
UCD Gaelic footballers